Suruç Water Tunnel ( is a water supply tunnel located in Suruç district of Şanlıurfa Province, southeastern Turkey. The purpose of the tunnel is to provide irrigation for the Suruç Valley from Atatürk Dam.

Technical features
The water tunnel was commissioned by the State Hydraulic Works (DSI) on December 25, 2008. For the building of the water tunnel, Ilci Construction Inc. was contracted. The construction works at an altitude of  AMSL began on March 18, 2009. The TBM was transported from Italy on 300 trailers, and its assembly completed after twelve months on August 21, 2010. The water tunnel has an average downhill slope of 0.49% through the Gazientep Formation of the Eocene and Oligocene geological period.

Economics
The construction cost about 2 billion. It is expected that the project will create jobs for at least 190,000 people in the region. With irrigation by the Suruç Water Tunnel, over 8,000 farmers will be able to produce more profitable agricultural product. Ministry of Forest and Water Management Veysel Eroğlu stated that its contribution to the country's economy will as much as 270 million annually.

See also
 List of long tunnels by type

References

Water tunnels
Water supply and sanitation in Turkey
Tunnels in Turkey
Tunnels completed in 2014
Buildings and structures in Şanlıurfa Province
Southeastern Anatolia Project
Irrigation in Turkey
2014 establishments in Turkey